Emilio Belaval Maldonado S. (born November 8, 1903 - died March 30, 1972) served for 9 years as an Associate Justice of the Supreme Court of Puerto Rico from 1953 to 1967.

Belaval Maldonado was born in Fajardo, Puerto Rico, and graduated from the University of Puerto Rico School of Law in 1927. In the field of law, he was a district judge, and later, an associate justice of the Supreme Court appointed by Puerto Rico Governor Luis Muñoz Marín and Secretary of the Hayes Committee, who was in charge of the investigation of the events of the Ponce massacre.

From a young age, Belaval Maldonado felt a love for writing and his first verses appeared in a Puerto Rico illustrated magazine, when he was just 14 years old. Belaval Maldonado devoted himself to the cultivation of the tale, from their initial two books: El Libro Azul (1918) and Cuentos para Celegiales (1922). In his stories he reflects about the Puerto Rican social reality. He was also president of Ateneo Puertorriqueño a cultural institution.

Belaval Maldonado died on March 30, 1972 at age 69 in San Juan, Puerto Rico.

References

1903 births
1972 deaths
People from Fajardo, Puerto Rico
University of Puerto Rico alumni
Associate Justices of the Supreme Court of Puerto Rico
Puerto Rican lawyers
Puerto Rican male writers
20th-century American lawyers
20th-century American judges
20th-century American male writers